Kansat is a union parishad under Shibganj Upazila, Chapai Nawabganj District in the Rajshahi Division of north-western Bangladesh.

History 
Kansat village was turned into a union in 1928. Now Kansat is developed in education, culture, sports etc.

Demographic 
According to the 2011 Bangladesh census, Kansat Union had a population of 34,194. Kansat has an average literacy rate of 61.5%.

Administration 
Kansat Union is divided in 16 wards and 20 villages.

The villages are:
 Kansat
 Biswanathpur
 Shibnagar
 Pukuria
 Shibnarawanpur
 Shibnagar Jaigirgram
 Mohonbag
 Kolkolia
 Gobinpur
 Kansat Bohalabari
 Baluchor
 Sahanbadha
 Shibnagar Monnapara
 Raghobpur 
 Selimabade
 Horipur
 Shibnagar Kaithapar
 Chalhoripur
 Perkansat
 Baghdurgapur
Chairman: Md. Benaul Islam

Education 
There are two college, two high school, 2 madrasha, 12 govt primary school in Kansat Union.

Transport 
The major transport systems inside the union is the bike, rickshaws, bi-cycle and CNG rickshaws. And major transport system to different places is Bus. There is no railway line in this union.

References 

Populated places in Rajshahi Division